Abdul Hannan Ansari (born 1927) is an Indian politician. He was elected to the Lok Sabha (the Lower House of the Indian Parliament), as a member of the Indian National Congress.

References

1927 births
Indian National Congress politicians from Bihar
Possibly living people
People from Madhubani, India
India MPs 1984–1989